or Koseinenkin Hall were public halls in Japan supported by welfare pension funds.

Kōsei Nenkin Kaikan halls existed in the following locations.
 Hiroshima City Cultural Exchange Hall (formerly Hiroshima Kōsei Nenkin Kaikan) in Naka-ku, Hiroshima
 Kanazawa
 Kokurakita-ku, Kitakyūshū
 Aichi Kōsei Nenkin Kaikan in Chikusa-ku, Nagoya
 Orix Theater (formerly Osaka Kōsei Nenkin Kaikan) in Nishi-ku, Osaka
 Tokyo Kōsei Nenkin Kaikan in Shinjuku, Tokyo (1961 – 31 March 2010)
 Hokkaido Kōsei Nenkin Kaikan in Chūō-ku, Sapporo
 Osaka

At least the following musicians have released recordings from Tokyo Kōsei Nenkin Kaikan:

 The Ventures, Ventures in Japan, 1965
 Masayuki Takayanagi & Kaoru Abe, June 28th, 1970
 Deep Purple, August 15 & 16, 1972, Made in Japan
 Herbie Hancock, Dedication, September 21, 1974
 Cannonball Adderley, The Japanese Concerts, 1975
 Milt Jackson, 1976
 Camel, January 27, 1980
 King Crimson, October 14, 1995
 Steve Hackett, The Tokyo Tapes, December 16 & 17, 1996
 Rainbow, December 5th, 8th, & 9th, 1976, On Stage recordings
 Frank Zappa, February 3rd, 1976
 Yellow Magic Orchestra, May 7th,1980

Concert halls in Japan